Pumpkin Hill Creek Preserve State Park is a Florida state park, located 12 miles north of Jacksonville, west of Big and Little Talbot Islands. From 1949 it has been part of the Talbot Islands State Park Complex.

Admission and Hours
There is no entrance charge. Florida state parks are open between 8 a.m. and sundown every day of the year (including holidays).

Gallery

External links

 Pumpkin Hill Creek Preserve State Park at Florida State Parks
 Pumpkin Hill Creek Preserve State Park at Wildernet
 Pumpkin Hill Creek Preserve State Park at St. Johns River Water Management District

State parks of Florida
Parks in Duval County, Florida
Northside, Jacksonville